Sand Creek Township is one of twelve townships in Bartholomew County, Indiana, United States. As of the 2010 census, its population was 2,390 and it contained 919 housing units.

History
The Elnora Daugherty Farm, William R. Gant Farm, and Newsom-Marr Farm are listed on the National Register of Historic Places.

Geography

Cities, towns, villages
 Elizabethtown

Unincorporated towns
 Azalia

Adjacent townships
 Rock Creek Township (northeast)
 Geneva Township, Jennings County (east)
 Redding Township, Jackson County (south)
 Wayne Township (west)
 Columbus Township (northwest)

Cemeteries
The township contains these three cemeteries: New Harmony, Sandcreek and Springer.

Major highways
  U.S. Route 31
  State Road 7

School districts
 Bartholomew County School Corporation

Political districts
 Indiana's 9th congressional district
 State House District 57
 State House District 65
 State Senate District 41

References
 United States Census Bureau 2007 TIGER/Line Shapefiles
 United States Board on Geographic Names (GNIS)
 United States National Atlas

External links

 Indiana Township Association
 United Township Association of Indiana

Townships in Bartholomew County, Indiana
Townships in Indiana